"The Barber" is an early short story by the American author Flannery O'Connor. It is one of the six stories included in O'Connor's 1947 master's thesis The Geranium: A Collection of Short Stories and was first published in New Signatures I: A Selection of College Writing in 1948. It later appeared in the 1971 collection The Complete Stories. The story involves a professor who feels a need to explain his liberal political views to a conservative barbershop.

References

Short stories by Flannery O'Connor
1947 short stories